Jean-Luc Joncas (born 16 December 1936) was a Progressive Conservative member of the House of Commons of Canada. He was a businessman by career.

Born in Amqui, Quebec, Joncas represented the Quebec riding of Matapédia—Matane where he was first elected in the 1984 federal election and re-elected in 1988, therefore becoming a member in the 33rd and 34th Canadian Parliaments.

Joncas left federal politics after his defeat in the 1993 federal election by René Canuel of the Bloc Québécois.

Electoral record

External links
 

1936 births
Living people
Members of the House of Commons of Canada from Quebec
Progressive Conservative Party of Canada MPs
People from Amqui